South Pointe High School may refer to:

South Pointe High School (Phoenix, Arizona)
South Pointe High School (Rock Hill, South Carolina)

See also
South Point High School (disambiguation)